The Vardar or Axios is the longest river in North Macedonia and the second longest river in Greece, in which it reaches the Aegean Sea at Thessaloniki.

Etymology
The name Vardar for the river may derive from Thracian, though Paeonian and Ancient Macedonian were also spoken in lands drained by the river. In any case, Vardar is thought to derive from an earlier *Vardários, which may ultimately derive from Proto-Indo-European (PIE) *(s)wordo-wori- ("black water"). Vardar/Vardarios may be a translation of (or otherwise had a similar meaning as compared to) Axios, which itself may be Thracian and may have meant 'not-shining' from PIE *n.-sk(e)i (cf. Avestan axšaēna ("dark-coloured")). This same hypothetical Thracian Axio- meaning “dark, not-shining” is theorized to be found in the name of a city at the mouth of the Danube, called Axiopolis in Greek and Axíopa (perhaps meaning "dark water") in Thracian, which may later have been translated into Slavic as Cernavodă (“black water”). The name Vardários (Βαρδάριος) was sometimes used by the Ancient Greeks in the 3rd century BC. The same name was widely used in the Byzantine era.  The word may ultimately be derived from the PIE root werǵ-, which is also the source of the English work. Its name Axios is mentioned by Homer (Il. 21.141, Il. 2.849) as the home of the Paeonians allies of Troy. Pjetër Bogdani would call it Asi, an earlier Albanian-language name for the river.

Geography

The river rises at Vrutok, a few kilometers southwest of Gostivar in North Macedonia. It passes through Gostivar, Skopje and into Veles, crosses the Greek border near Gevgelija, Polykastro and Axioupoli ("town on the Axiós"), before emptying into the Aegean Sea in Central Macedonia, west of Thessaloniki in northern Greece.

The Vardar basin comprises two-thirds of the territory of North Macedonia. The valley features fertile lands in the Polog region, around Gevgelija and in the Thessaloniki regional unit. The river is surrounded by mountains elsewhere. The superhighways Greek National Road 1 in Greece and M1 and E75 run within the valley along the river's entire length to near Skopje.

The river was very famous during the Ottoman Empire and remains so in modern-day Turkey as the inspiration for many folk songs, of which the most famous is Vardar Ovasi. It has also been depicted on the coat of arms of Skopje, which in turn is incorporated in the city's flag.

Project to construct the Danube-Vardar-Aegean Canal
The project to construct the Danube-Morava-Vardar-Aegean Canal has been a dream for a long time. Le Figaro published a project of Athens and Belgrade on 28.08.2017. The Greek-Serbian proposal made in Beijing is Pharaonic: 651 km. A project worth 17 billion.

Vardaris wind
The Vardaris or Vardarec is a powerful prevailing northerly ravine wind which blows across the river valley in Greece as well as in North Macedonia. At first it descends along the "canal" of the Vardar valley, usually as a breeze. When it encounters the high mountains that separate Greece from North Macedonia, it descends the other side, gathering a tremendous momentum and bringing cold conditions to the city of Thessaloniki and the Axios delta. Somewhat similar to the mistral wind of France, it occurs when atmospheric pressure over eastern Europe is higher than over the Aegean Sea, as is often the case in winter.

Gallery

See also
 Great Morava
 Pčinja River

References

External links

 Proceedings of the 1st Axios Catchment Consortium Meeting  by the European Commission—DG Research
 PIM "Ivan Milutinović", Belgrade, Serbia; Morava - Vardar (Axios) Navigation Route—About 1,200 km shorter route (three days shorter time of navigation) from Belgrade to Port of Thessaloniki than across Danube, Black Sea and Aegean Sea. Electric power production, improvement of water quality and regulation of flooding wave.
 Morava—Vardar (Axios) Navigation Route map
 Hydropower and navigation system "Morava"—Concepts of regulation of rivers Great Morava and South Morava for navigation and hydropower production

 
Geography of ancient Paeonia
Geography of Macedonia (region)
International rivers of Europe
Landforms of Central Macedonia
Landforms of Kilkis (regional unit)
Landforms of Thessaloniki (regional unit)
Rivers of Greece
Rivers of North Macedonia
Geography of Skopje